James Austin Russel Macauley (19 October 1922 – November 2000) was a Scottish footballer who played as a wing-half.

Club career
Macauley played as a midfielder for Chelsea, amassing 86 league appearances, with five goals. He played in the 1947 FA Cup, in a 2–0 win over Arsenal in front of 183,135 spectators.

References

1922 births
2000 deaths
Footballers from Edinburgh
Scottish footballers
Association football midfielders
Chelsea F.C. players
Aldershot Town F.C. players